The Baldwin DR-12-8-1500/2 (known informally as the Centipede) was the Baldwin Locomotive Works' first serious attempt at a production road diesel locomotive. The Baldwin type designation was DR-12-8-1500/2, meaning Diesel Road locomotive, with 12 axles (8 of which were driven), and two engines of  each. The trucks were configured in a 2-D+D-2 wheel arrangement. The nickname came from the numerous axles set in a nearly unbroken line, much like the legs of a centipede.

History
Built between December 1945 and July 1948, the "Babyface" design reflected Baldwin steam and electric locomotive practice. The carbody rode on two massive articulated cast steel half-frames cast by General Steel Castings, linked at the middle with a hinged joint. Unpowered four-wheel trucks at each end guided the locomotive through curves for stability at speed. Internal wiring was passed through metal conduits exactly like those used on a steam locomotive, which proved troublesome in practice.

The prototype 2-unit set was built in 1945 and toured American railroads. Orders followed from the Pennsylvania Railroad, the Seaboard Air Line Railroad, and the National Railways of Mexico (NdeM). The two demonstrators (originally ordered by Union Pacific Railroad as #998 and #999) were never sold and were eventually scrapped. The "Centipedes" were essentially obsolete during production, unable to compete with the more advanced locomotive design and technology offered by EMD. Reliability was an ongoing problem, and as they were built one at a time (like steam locomotives) each one was a bit different in the placement of wiring and equipment, which complicated even routine maintenance. The PRR units were eventually derated and relegated to helper service. Most PRR and SAL units were scrapped by the early 1960s, while NdeM units lasted slightly longer and were in service until the late 1960s. No Centipedes have been preserved.

Original buyers

Footnote
In 1943 Baldwin built an experimental  "Centipede" as a demonstrator unit, which was assigned road #6000. The uniquely styled unit, with its upright, aggressive prow, also utilized the 2-D+D-2 wheel arrangement, but was to be powered with eight V8 8LV diesel engines, though only four were actually installed. The lone unit was classified by Baldwin as the 

4-8-8-4-750/8DE1 and scrapped soon after production, and its running gear was used for the Seaboard Air Line’s first centipede #4500.

References

External links
 Baldwin DR-12-8-1500/2 (Centipede) Roster
 The Centipede, DR-12-8-3000 (American-Rails.com)

Diesel-electric locomotives of the United States
2-D+D-2 locomotives
Centipede
Railway locomotives introduced in 1945
Scrapped locomotives
Standard gauge locomotives of the United States
Standard gauge locomotives of Mexico
Diesel-electric locomotives of Mexico
Streamlined diesel locomotives